Israel competed at the Asian Games five times, from 1954 to 1974.

History
Israel, after its founding in 1948 began applying to the International Olympic Committee for membership. This was granted in 1952, allowing them to first participate in the Asian Games in 1954.

Israel was part of the Asian Games Federation and participated in the games from 1954 through 1974. In 1981 the Asian Games Federation was organized as the Olympic Council of Asia and for political reasons Israel was excluded. Following this, in 1982, it was voted on to permanently ban Israel from the games.

Prior to that, Israel was twice unable to participate in the Games of 1962 and 1978, also for political reasons. In 1962 the host country Indonesia, refused to permit the participation of Israel due to political reasons, stating it would cause issues with their relationship with the Arab states. In July 1976 the 25 members of the Asian Games Federation were canvassed to see if Israel should participate in the 1978 Games, with all 12 responses received voting against including Israel.

Medals

Medals by Asian Games

Medals by sport

1954 Asian Games

1958 Asian Games

1966 Asian Games

1970 Asian Games

1974 Asian Games

References

External links 
Israeli Olympic Committee

 
Nations at the Asian Games